In graph theory, a branch of mathematics, a -biclique-free graph is a graph that has no -vertex complete bipartite graph  as a subgraph. A family of graphs is biclique-free if there exists a number  such that the graphs in the family are all -biclique-free. The biclique-free graph families form one of the most general types of sparse graph family. They arise in incidence problems in discrete geometry, and have also been used in parameterized complexity.

Properties

Sparsity
According to the Kővári–Sós–Turán theorem, every -vertex -biclique-free graph has  edges, significantly fewer than a dense graph would have.

Relation to other types of sparse graph family
A graph with degeneracy  is necessarily -biclique-free. Additionally, any nowhere dense family of graphs is biclique-free.
In this way, the biclique-free graph families unify two of the most general classes of sparse graphs.

Applications

Discrete geometry
In discrete geometry, many types of incidence graph are necessarily biclique-free. As a simple example, the graph of incidences between a finite set of points and lines in the Euclidean plane necessarily has no  subgraph.

Parameterized complexity
Biclique-free graphs have been used in parameterized complexity to develop algorithms that are efficient for sparse graphs with suitably small input parameter values. Similar results are true for many variations of the dominating set problem. It is also possible to test whether one dominating set of size at most  can be converted to another one by a chain of vertex insertions and deletions, preserving the dominating property, with the same parameterization.

References

Extremal graph theory
Graph families